The 2014 AFC Champions League was the 33rd edition of the top-level Asian club football tournament organized by the Asian Football Confederation (AFC), and the 12th under the current AFC Champions League title. Guangzhou Evergrande were the defending champions, but were eliminated by Western Sydney Wanderers in the quarter-finals.

In the final, Western Sydney Wanderers of Australia defeated Al-Hilal of Saudi Arabia 1–0 on aggregate, to become the first Australian team to win the title, and in doing so qualified for the 2014 FIFA Club World Cup. The Australian club were making their debut in the competition, having won entry to the competition by winning the 2012–13 A-League Premiership in their first year of existence.

Allocation of entries per association
The AFC laid out the procedure for deciding the participating associations and the allocation of slots, with inspection of the associations interested in participating in the AFC Champions League to be done in 2013, and the final decision to be made by the AFC on 26 November 2013.

The AFC Competitions Committee proposed the following participating criteria for the 2014–2016 editions of the AFC Champions League on 12 March 2013:
The top 23 member associations (MAs) as per the AFC rankings can apply either for direct slots or play-off slots. The interested MAs are given points and ranked according to the AFC evaluating system.
In both the East and West zones, there are a total of 14 direct slots in the group stage, with the 2 remaining slots filled through play-offs.
The top five MAs in both the East and West zones, if they acquire a minimum of 600 points, get direct slots in the group stage, while the remaining MAs, if they meet the minimum requirements, get play-off slots. The following scheme of allocating slots was approved by the AFC for the 2014–16 tournaments:
The top two ranked MAs in both the East and West zones get four direct slots each.
The third-ranked MAs get three direct and one play-off slot.
The fourth-ranked MAs get two direct and two play-off slots.
The fifth-ranked MAs get one direct and two play-off slots.
The sixth- to eleventh-ranked MAs each get one play-off slot.
The maximum number of slots for each MA is one-third of the total number of clubs in the top division (e.g., Australia can only get a maximum of three total slots as there are only nine Australia-based clubs in the A-League).
The AFC Cup winners and runners-up are given a play-off slot, regardless of their respective MA's rank, as long as the club meets the minimum criteria. If they have already qualified based on domestic performance, the slot is given to the next eligible club in its MA, as long as the club meets the minimum criteria.

On 26 November 2013, the AFC Executive Committee approved the slots for the 2014 edition of the AFC Champions League.

Notes

Teams
The following teams entered the competition.

In the following table, the number of appearances and last appearance count only those since the 2002–03 season (including qualifying rounds), when the competition was rebranded as the AFC Champions League. TH means title holders.

Notes

Schedule
The schedule of the competition was as follows (all draws held at AFC headquarters in Kuala Lumpur, Malaysia).

On 25 November 2013, the AFC Competitions Committee proposed to continue to play the final over two legs on a home-and-away basis (instead of reverting to playing the final as a single match as original proposed), and to split the competition on zonal basis to guarantee an East vs West final for the next three years.

Qualifying play-off

The bracket for the qualifying play-off was determined by the AFC based on the association ranking of each team, with teams from the higher-ranked associations entering at later rounds. Teams from the same association may not play each other in the qualifying play-off. Each tie was played as a single match, with the team from the higher-ranked association hosting the match. Extra time and penalty shoot-out were used to decide the winner if necessary. The winners of each tie in round 3 advanced to the group stage to join the 28 automatic qualifiers. All losers of each round from associations with only play-off slots entered the 2014 AFC Cup group stage.

Round 1

|-
!colspan=3|West Asia Zone

|-
!colspan=3|East Asia Zone

|}

Round 2

|-
!colspan=3|West Asia Zone

|-
!colspan=3|East Asia Zone

|}

Round 3

|-
!colspan=3|West Asia Zone

|-
!colspan=3|East Asia Zone

|}

Group stage

The draw for the group stage was held on 10 December 2013. The 32 teams were drawn into eight groups of four. Teams from the same association could not be drawn into the same group. Each group was played on a home-and-away round-robin basis. The winners and runners-up of each group advanced to the round of 16.

Tiebreakers
The teams are ranked according to points (3 points for a win, 1 point for a draw, 0 points for a loss). If tied on points, tiebreakers are applied in the following order:
Greater number of points obtained in the group matches between the teams concerned
Goal difference resulting from the group matches between the teams concerned
Greater number of goals scored in the group matches between the teams concerned (away goals do not apply)
Goal difference in all the group matches
Greater number of goals scored in all the group matches
Penalty shoot-out if only two teams are involved and they are both on the field of play
Fewer score calculated according to the number of yellow and red cards received in the group matches (1 point for a single yellow card, 3 points for a red card as a consequence of two yellow cards, 3 points for a direct red card, 4 points for a yellow card followed by a direct red card)
Drawing of lots

Group A

Group B

Tiebreakers
Bunyodkor and El-Jaish are tied on head-to-head record and overall goal difference, and so are ranked on overall goals scored.

Group C

Group D

Tiebreakers
Al-Ahli and Sepahan are ranked on head-to-head record.

Group E

Group F

Tiebreakers
Beijing Guoan and Central Coast Mariners are tied on head-to-head record, and so are ranked by overall goal difference.

Group G

Tiebreakers
Jeonbuk Hyundai Motors and Melbourne Victory are tied on head-to-head record, and so are ranked by overall goal difference.

Group H

Tiebreakers
Western Sydney Wanderers and Kawasaki Frontale are tied on head-to-head record, and so are ranked by overall goal difference.

Knockout stage

In the knock-out stage, the 16 teams played a single-elimination tournament, with the teams split between the two zones until the final. Each tie was played on a home-and-away two-legged basis. The away goals rule, extra time (away goals do not apply in extra time) and penalty shoot-out were used to decide the winner if necessary.

Bracket

Round of 16
In the round of 16, the winners of one group played the runners-up of another group in the same zone, with the group winners hosting the second leg.

Quarter-finals
The draw for the quarter-finals was held on 28 May 2014. The "country protection" rule was not applied, so teams from the same association could be drawn into the same tie.

Semi-finals

Final

The draw to decide the order of two legs of the final was held after the quarter-final draw.

Awards

Top scorers

See also
2014 AFC Cup
2014 AFC President's Cup
2014 FIFA Club World Cup

References

External links
AFC Champions League, the-AFC.com

 
2014
1